Pushkar Gogia is an Indian Television Actor, Numerologist, Astrologer and Vastu expert. He started his career in television with a cameo role in Anamika on Sony TV where he played the role of Anand Kumar. After being recognised, he got the break with Balaji Telefilms to play the role of Nakul in a mythological serial named Dharmakshetra which was aired on Epic Channel. Last seen with Rashmi Sharma Telefilm's launched daily soap Desh Ki Beti Nandini portraying the character of Siddharth Pandey, Nandini's Brother. His Role was very well recognised and much appreciated.

Personal life
Gogia was born in a business family of Delhi. He has one younger brother. He took up higher studies and completed his MBA from Indian Institute of Planning and Management, New Delhi. He has worked with a private bank for a year and then decided to try his hands on acting.

Career
Goggiaa had undergone formal training for his acting. He has undertaken various modeling assignments for brands like Axis Bank, Uninor, Toyota, Omaxe, Raja Biscuits, IPL, etc. He was also seen in Bajaj Platina Electric Start TV Commercial.

In South industry, he has worked for brands like Vasanth & Co and Sree Kumar Thangamaligaie.

Goggiaa is a professional numerologist and vastu expert. He runs a consultancy where he provides consultations for numerology, astrology and vastu.

Filmography

Television

Other episodic shows

References

External links
 

Living people
Indian male television actors
Male actors from Mumbai
Indian male soap opera actors
Indian Institute of Planning and Management alumni
21st-century Indian male actors
Year of birth missing (living people)